Mad River Brewing Company is a brewery established in 1989 and located in Blue Lake, California, known for its green production processes.

History and awards
The brewery was established 1989 by brewmaster Bob Smith. Its Steelhead Extra Pale Ale was listed by the Oakland Tribune as one of ten "quintessential Northern California beers". Other beers produced by Mad River have included Steelhead Stout, Serious Madness Black Ale, Double Dread Imperial Red, and John Barleycorn Barleywine.

The brewery has won local, national and international awards including in the World Beer Cup and the Great American Beer Festival. At the 2010 Great American Beer Festival they won best brewery in the nation in their class, the Small Brewing Company and Small Brewing Company Brewer of the Year.

Waste reduction and recycling
The company attempts to reuse all of its equipment and materials and has a reported waste reduction rate of 98 percent. Much of the organic waste, ten tons of spent barley malt and yeast a year, are fed to local livestock or used as composting material. For their efforts in waste reduction the company won 7 WRAP awards presented by the California Integrated Waste Management Board.

Awards

See also

 California breweries
 Beer in the United States

References

External links
 

Beer brewing companies based in Humboldt County, California
Blue Lake, California
1989 establishments in California